Smooth as Silk is a 1946 American noir film directed by Charles Barton and starring Kent Taylor, Virginia Grey, and Milburn Stone. The film is also known as Notorious Gentleman as it is a version of 1935 film A Notorious Gentleman. The film focuses on the murder of a theater producer (John Litel) committed by a lawyer (Kent Taylor), after the lawyer's bride, an actress (Virginia Gray), left him for the producer to win a role in his new musical. Despite the fascinating plot and tense intrigue, this film failed to attract much attention.

Plot
Successful lawyer Mark Fenton (Kent Taylor) seeks to acquit young playboy Don Elliott (Danny Morton), accused of drunk driving and hitting a pedestrian to death. After completing the case, Mark approaches Don's uncle and trustee—the respected theater producer Stephen Elliott (John Litel)—to give his girlfriend, actress Paula Marlowe (Virginia Gray) a role in his new theatrical production. Stephen rejects the approach but compensates his refusal with a generous fee. Meanwhile, Paula's younger sister Susan (Jane Adams) arrives from the province, and Mark invites both sisters to a restaurant. During the dinner, Paula is extremely upset by Stephen's refusal to give her the role. There Mark introduces the sisters to the district attorney and his friend John Kimble (Milburn Stone), and to his teacher, the experienced lawyer Fletcher Holiday (Charles Trowbridge). They notice Don Elliott drinking at the bar counter. Mark mentions that Don is a Stephen's nephew and heir of the whole family wealth, which is now managed by his uncle. This fact invites Paula's keen interest. She leaves the company and meets with Don—to arrange a meeting at her home that evening. Paula begins dating Don on a regular basis. This pleases Stephen very mush, because under her influence, Don quits drinking. One evening, Paula turns to Don, requesting to arrange her for the coveted role in the Stephen's play. However, Don refuses to talk about this with his uncle on the grounds that the main character of the play is a vicious and deceitful woman, and such a role does not fit Paula at all.

Admired by Paula's influence on his nephew, Steven decides to invite her to a dinner party. Although Susan sees Paula simply manipulating both men for the role, she, nevertheless, agrees to accompany her sister at the dinner in the Elliots' house. Learning during the dinner that Don will not inherit the family fortune if he marries before he is 30, Paula tells Stephen that Don is not really interested in her but in Susan. Feeling that Stephen likes her, Paula directly asks him for a major role in his new play. After consulting with his butler Walcott (Harry Cheshire), Steven immediately approves her ask. After that evening, Paula begins dating Stephen, while staying in touch with Mark but ignoring Don, who again starts to drink because of despair. The premiere of the Stephen's new play with Paula in the title role sees a great success. At a party after the successful premiere, Mark tries to clarify his relationship with Paula, but Stephen publicly announces his engagement with her. After hearing these words, the furious Mark pounces at Stephen with fists, but then, at the request of Paula, leaves the place.

Mark hires a private detective to arrange secret surveillance for both Paula and Stephen—and soon receive information on their immediate plans, as well as on a tense conversation between Stephen and Don, during which Don threatened his uncle. Then Mark sneaks into Paula's apartment and steals her bracelet and cigarette butt, and then goes to see Stephen. Threatening him with the weapon, Mark tells Stephen that he will shoot him and frame him for murdering Paula. In despair, Stephen proposes to break his engagement with Paula, but the lawyer still kills him. Leaving the evidence to frame Paula for this murder, Mark imperceptibly goes outside and waits for her arrival. When Paula discovers the Stephen's body, she storms out of the house into the street, where she encounters Mark, who allegedly came to apologize to Stephen for the yesterday's incident. After sending Paula home, Mark calls prosecutor Kimble, stating that he has just shot Stephen Elliott. Arriving at the place of crime, Kimble immediately begins to suspect that Mark tries to cover Paula, especially after he finds the evidence that Mark planted in advance. Kimble detains Paula, and Mark, insisting on his own fault, persuades Holiday to become his lawyer. Meticulous Holiday demands conducting an investigative experiment, the result of which only aggravating suspicions against Paula. Mark begins to fear that Paula may be really convicted. To avoid it, Mark convinces Don that it was he who, being drunk, killed Stephen. After Mark's departure, the depressed Don calls Kimble, confesses to the murder, and says that he is going to commit suicide. When Don mentions that it was Mark who convinced him it his fault, Kimble responds that he knows who is actually the murderer.

Soon, Mark receives a letter from Don, who reports that he confessed to the prosecutor and wanted to commit suicide but he did not have enough strength to do so. Fearing that he could still shoot himself, Don has sent Mark a pistol along with the letter. Mark, taking the received weapon, again comes to the house of the Elliotts, intent on killing Don and disguising the murder as suicide. When Mark shoots the supposedly sleeping Don, Kimble appears along with the police officers who arrest Mark for killing Steven. As it turns out, Kimble specifically arranged this trap for Mark, persuading Don to serve as bait and preloading his pistol with empty cartridges.

Cast
Kent Taylor as Mark Fenton
Virginia Grey as Paula Marlowe
Jane Adams as Susan Marlowe
Milburn Stone as John Kimble
John Litel as Stephen Elliott
Danny Morton as Don Elliott
Charles Trowbridge as Fletcher Holliday
Theresa Harris as Louise
Ralph Brooks as Detective
Bert Moorhouse as Detective
Harry Cheshire as Walcott

Reception
Hal Erickson of Allmovie gave the film three stars out of five and stated "Though running a scant 65 minutes, Smooth as Silk packs a bigger wallop than some of Universal's more ambitious "A" melodramas of the same period."

Home media
Smooth as Silk was released on DVD on January 31, 2017.

References

External links
 
 
 

1949 films
1940s English-language films
Universal Pictures films
Films directed by Charles Barton
American black-and-white films
American crime drama films
1949 crime drama films
Film noir
Films with screenplays by Florence Ryerson
1940s American films